Alice Glaston ( – 13 April 1546) was an 11-year-old English girl from Little Wenlock who was hanged in Much Wenlock, Shropshire, England under the reign of Henry VIII. She is likely the youngest girl ever to be legally executed in England, though 8 or 9-year-old John Dean was hanged for arson in 1629. The crime for which she was hanged is unknown, but it is speculated that she was accused of either murder or witchcraft. She was hanged with two other people. Sir Thomas Butler, vicar of Much Wenlock, records Glaston's burial at his church.

In October 2014, writer Paul Evans released The Spirit Child, a speculative supernatural radio play about the events leading to her execution.

See also
 Capital punishment in the United Kingdom
 John Dean, 8- or 9-year-old boy who was the youngest person executed in the history of England
 Hannah Ocuish
 Mary (slave)

References

1530s births
1545 deaths
Date of birth unknown
Year of birth unknown
16th-century executions by England
Executed children